Zhao Heng (born 24 January 1997) is a Chinese footballer who plays as a goalkeeper for Chinese club Fuzhou Hengxing.

Career statistics

Club
.

References

1997 births
Living people
Chinese footballers
Association football goalkeepers
China League Two players
China League One players
Sichuan Jiuniu F.C. players